Cloughton (pronounced Clow-tun) is a small village and civil parish in the Scarborough district of North Yorkshire, England.

Description

It has a parish church and two pubs – the Blacksmiths Arms and the Red Lion. It is home to a large conference centre and hotel called Cober Hill. It has cricket and football pitches.

According to the 2011 UK census, Cloughton parish had a population of 687, a reduction on the 2001 UK census figure of 711.
The parish council is Cloughton Parish Council.

Craig White, Yorkshire cricketer, lives in Cloughton. 
It was also the home of the Reverend G P Taylor, author of Shadowmancer and Wormwood.
Craig Hiley, Yorkshire Photographer, lives in Cloughton.

References

External links

Cloughton Parish Council website
History of Cloughton

Villages in North Yorkshire
Civil parishes in North Yorkshire